Chhattisgarh Vikas Party was an extremely short-lived group of twelve MLAs who had defected from the Bhartiya Janata Party and announced the grouping's name with the suffix 'Party' in order to circumvent the anti-defection law and merged into the Congress Party the next day.

Chhattisgarh Vikas Party was a vehicle to carry the defectors safely into the party of choice without inviting the wrath of the anti-defection law. It would be wrong to call the grouping a political party. political party in Chhattisgarh, India.

CVP was formed on December 20, 2001, when 12 members of the state legislative assembly belonging to the Bharatiya Janata Party broke away. CVP was led by Tarun Chatterji. CVP was recognized by the Congress-affiliated Speaker of the assembly. The following day CVP merged into the Indian National Congress.

Members of the CVP were Haridas Baradwaj, Ganguram Baghel, Sakrajit Nayak, Madan Singh Deheria, Paresh Agrawal, Sohanlal, Shyama Dhruba, Premsingh Sidar, Vikram Bhagat, Lokendra Yadav and Rani Ratnamala Devi along with Tarun Chatterji.

References

Defunct political parties in Chhattisgarh
Political parties in Chhattisgarh
2002 establishments in Chhattisgarh
2002 disestablishments in India
Political parties established in 2002
Political parties disestablished in 2002